The statue of León Felipe is installed in Mexico City's Chapultepec park, in Mexico. The statue was created by Julián Martinez in 1973, and dedicated in 1974.

See also
 1974 in art

References

External links

 

1974 establishments in Mexico
1974 sculptures
Chapultepec
Monuments and memorials in Mexico City
Outdoor sculptures in Mexico City
Sculptures of men in Mexico
Statues in Mexico City
Statues of writers